The Office of E-Government & Information Technology, also called the E-Gov office or the Office of the Federal CIO (OFCIO), develops and guides the U.S. federal government's use of Internet-based technologies for the public to interact with the government. The office is part of the Office of Management and Budget.

The E-Gov office is headed by the Federal Chief Information Officer of the United States.

History 
The E-Government Act of 2002 defined and authorized creation of this office.

See also 
 E-Government Unit, an analogous office in the United Kingdom.
 E-Government
 E-Governance

References

External links
 

United States Office of Management and Budget
E-government in the United States